New York-Barcelona Crossing, Volumen 2 is an album by jazz pianist Brad Mehldau, with Perico Sambeat (alto sax), Mario Rossy (bass) and Jorge Rossy (drums).

Music and recording
The album was recorded in concert at the Jamboree Club in Barcelona on May 10, 1993. The material is mostly jazz standards and pieces from the Great American Songbook.

Reception
The Penguin Guide to Jazz commented that this album was not as good as New York-Barcelona Crossing, Volumen 1, but that "It's Easy to Remember" is "another gorgeous ballad performance, at a dangerously slow tempo". The AllMusic reviewer wrote that "What is engrossing about the disc is the utter fluidity with which these four young musicians from varying backgrounds are able to communicate using the common language of standard songs."

Track listing
"I've Told Every Little Star" (Jerome Kern)
"Un Poco Loco" (Bud Powell)
"Easy to Remember" (Richard Rodgers)
"Played Twice" (Thelonious Monk)
"Dat Dere" (Bobby Timmons)
"Cousin Mary" (John Coltrane)
"No Blues" (Miles Davis)

Personnel
 Brad Mehldau – piano
 Perico Sambeat – alto sax
 Mario Rossy – bass
 Jorge Rossy – drums

References

Brad Mehldau albums
1993 live albums